Jens Peter Edvin Hansen (21 January 1920 – 30 March 1990) was a Danish footballer. He was also part of Denmark's squad for the football tournament at the 1948 Summer Olympics, but he did not play in any matches.

Club career
Hansen mainly played for hometown club Køge Boldklub during his career. He had a one-year stint with Grimsby Town in the First Division, making only one appearance. His performance was skewered with deadly politeness in A Who's Who of Grimsby Town: "Hansen was somewhat out of his depth in an English first division match."

International career
Hansen gained his first cap for Denmark on 15 June 1948 in a 3–0 win against Finland. He was also part of Denmark's squad for the football tournament at the 1948 Summer Olympics which finished third, but he did not play in any matches. He since captained the national team on three occasions.

Managerial career
Hansen managed Køge Boldklub from 1974 to 1978, miraculously winning the Danish Football Championship in the 1975 season.

Honours

Player
Denmark
 Olympic Bronze Medal: 1948

Manager
Køge Boldklub
 1st Division: 1975

References

1920 births
1990 deaths
People from Køge
Sportspeople from Region Zealand
Association football midfielders
Danish men's footballers
Denmark international footballers
Køge Boldklub players
Grimsby Town F.C. players
English Football League players
Danish expatriate men's footballers
Expatriate footballers in England
Danish expatriate sportspeople in England
Olympic footballers of Denmark
Danish football managers
Køge Boldklub managers